Thermopylae is a mountain passage in central Greece.

Thermopylae may also refer to:
 Thermopylae (clipper), an extreme composite clipper ship built 1868
, Royal Navy submarine launched in 1945
 Thermopylae, a poem written by the Greek poet Constantine P. Cavafy
 Thermopylae, North Carolina, the fictional setting of Michael Malone's novel, Handling Sin

See also 
 Battle of Thermopylae (disambiguation)